MV Miseford is a tugboat built in 1915 by M. Beatty & Sons Ltd. in Welland, Ontario.

Miseford is 80 feet long, 20 feet wide and has a draught of 9.42 feet. It displaces 114 gross tons and was originally powered by a triple-expansion steam engine with two coal-fired boilers (make, size, and info unknown). The hull is riveted plate steel from when the tug was originally made. This tug was originally built for Alvin J. Misener & Erwin G. Tedford (owned from 1915 to 1922); then it was in possession of the Minister of Game & Fisheries for the Province of Ontario (from 1922 to 1940). Since then it has been sold a few times, until 2005, when it was purchased by Thunder Bay Tug Services.

On November 4, 1965 the Miseford was driven aground by strong winds in the St. Marys River. It was "salvaged" in 1966,. the tug was rebuilt and re-powered with a Detroit Diesel Quad-71 power pack, which has 4 Detroit Diesel 6-71 marine engines producing approximately 900 hp, mounted on a single gearbox in 1953, 2 Caterpillar D311 (4-cylinder) diesel generators producing 30 KW each, and a Perkins 4-cylinder diesel hydraulic pump to power the hydraulic bow thruster.

See also
 MV Point Valour
 MV Glenada
 MV Robert W.

References

Welland
Tugboats of Canada
1915 ships
Ships built in Ontario
Tugboats on the Great Lakes